Longford Railway Station serves the town of Longford in County Longford, Ireland.

Longford is the terminus of Iarnród Éireann's Dublin Connolly–Longford Commuter service, and is also a stop on the Dublin Connolly–Sligo InterCity service.

Journeys to the capital by rail generally take about an hour and three quarters.

Numerous Bus Éireann Expressway and local bus routes stop immediately outside the station. Independent Cavan operator Whartons Travel operates a route to the station via Crossdoney, Arvagh and Drumlish.

History

Longford railway station was opened by the Midland Great Western Railway on 8 November 1855 as the terminus of the extension of its line north-west from Mullingar. The line was further extended to Sligo in 1862.

See also
 List of railway stations in Ireland

References

External links

Irish Rail Longford Station Website

Iarnród Éireann stations in County Longford
Railway Station
Railway stations in County Longford
Railway stations opened in 1855
1855 establishments in Ireland
Railway stations in the Republic of Ireland opened in the 19th century